The 31st Trampoline Gymnastics World Championships was held at the Stadium Arena Fyn in Odense, Denmark, from November 25–28, 2015. This event was the first qualifying round for the 2016 Olympics which was held in Rio de Janeiro. The top 8 men and women automatically earned their nation quota places for the Olympics, subject to a maximum of two quota places per nation. A further 16 of each sex will get a second chance to earn a quota place at the Rio de Janeiro test event in April 2016 for a further five spots.

Medal summary

Medal table

Results

Men's results

Individual Trampoline
Qualification

Final

Synchro

Trampoline Team

Double Mini

Double Mini Team

Tumbling

Tumbling Team

Women's Results

Individual Trampoline
Qualification

Synchro

Trampoline Team
The women's trampoline team final took place on November 18.

Double Mini

Double Mini Team

Tumbling

Tumbling Team

References

External links
 Official website (Archive)

World Trampoline Championships
2015
Sport in Odense
International gymnastics competitions hosted by Denmark
2015 in Danish sport